Nutticha Namwong (born 5 September 1996) or stage name Kaykai Salaider, is a Thai female YouTuber. Her YouTube channel currently has 15.8 million subscribers. She became the first Thai YouTuber to hit over 10 million subscribers

Early life
She was born on 5 September 1996 in Bangkok. She finished secondary school at Ruettiya Wannarai School. She is currently studying at Bangkok University.

Career
She started being a YouTuber in 2016, by uploading her first clip "Plod Nee Hai Khun Mae" (in English: Paying Off Mother's Debt).

She also starred in the film Senior and had a role in the Season 3 of Thai series Hormones.

References

Nutticha Namwong
Nutticha Namwong
1996 births
Living people